Luís Filipe Rocha (born 16 November 1947) is a Portuguese film director, screenwriter and actor. He has directed ten films since 1976. His film Cerromaior was screened in the Un Certain Regard section at the 1981 Cannes Film Festival.

Filmography
 Barronhos (1976)
 A Fuga (1976)
 Cerromaior (1981)
 Sinais de Vida (1984)
 Amor e Dedinhos de Pé (1993)
 Sinais de Fogo (1995)
 Adeus, Pai (1996)
 Camarate (2001)
 A Passagem da Noite (2003)
 A Outra Margem (2007)
 Cinzento e Negro (2015)

References

Bibliographic references
  O Cais do Olhar by José de Matos-Cruz, Portuguese Cinematheque, 1999

External links

1947 births
Living people
Portuguese film directors
Portuguese screenwriters
Male screenwriters
Portuguese male writers
Portuguese male film actors
People from Lisbon